Bacon Township is a township in Vernon County, in the U.S. state of Missouri.

Bacon Township was erected in 1856, taking its name from James Bacon, a pioneer citizen.

References

Townships in Missouri
Townships in Vernon County, Missouri